The Macau Olympic Aquatic Centre is an aquatic center in Taipa, Macau, China. Inaugurated on March 28, 2003, the aquatic center covers a total area of 3,220 m2 and has a seating capacity of 1,500. The Aquatic Centre includes a diving pool 25 meters by 25 meters (with an adjustable floor capable of reaching a maximum depth of 5 meters) and a 50m swimming pool with 10 lanes. Both facilities comply with the latest FINA standards and are eligible for holding international competitions. Water quality is maintained by a sophisticated sanitizing system using ozone, instead of chlorine.

See also
 Sports in Macau

References

Indoor arenas in Macau
Sports venues in Macau
Swimming venues in China
2003 establishments in Macau
Taipa